Puruşārthasiddhyupāya (Purushartha Siddhyupaya) is a major Jain text authored by Acharya Amritchandra. Acharya Amritchandra was a Digambara Acharya who lived in the tenth century (Vikram Samvat). Puruşārthasiddhyupāya deals with the conduct of householder (sravak) in detail. Another major Jain text that deals with householder's conduct is Ratnakaranda śrāvakācāra. Puruşārthasiddhyupāya also deals extensively with the Jain concept of ahiṃsā.

Content 
Like all Jain texts first sloka (aphorism) of Puruşārthasiddhyupāya is an invocation:

Ahimsa 

Puruşārthasiddhyupāya deals extensively with the Jaina concept of ahimsa (non-injury) particularly in reference to its observance as a minor vow (anuvrata) by the Śrāvaka. In "Verse 43" deliberate himsa (injury) is defined as “acting under the influence of passions, an injury caused to physical or psychical vitalities” (verse 43). Acharya Amritchandra then elaborates on the observances that help the householder in abiding by his minor vow of ahimsa. 
Eleven verses (79-89), cautions the householder regarding certain misconstrued notions that people put forward to justify their acts of himsa.

See also 
 Tattvartha Sutra

Notes

References 
 
 

Jain texts